Geoff Wegerle (born 9 June 1954) is a South African former football (soccer) forward who played professionally in Europe, South Africa and the North American Soccer League.

Wegerle scored 20 goals when his club Arcadia Shepherds won the South African treble in 1974. He played for Feyenoord in Rotterdam from 1975 to 1976, along with his brother Steve. They finished 2nd with Feyenoord in the Dutch competition in that 1975/1976 season, with 88 goals for and 40 goals against.  In 1978, Wegerle played for the Oakland Stompers of the North American Soccer League.  He returned to the league in 1983 for two seasons with the Toronto Blizzard.  Wegerle played for the independent Tampa Bay Rowdies in 1986.  In January 1987, he signed with the Rowdies as they were playing in the American Indoor Soccer Association.  In December 1987, the Rowdies signed Wegerle for the upcoming American Soccer League season. Both of his brothers, Steve and Roy, have also played for the Rowdies over the course of their careers.

References

External links
 NASL stats

1954 births
Living people
Soccer players from Pretoria
Association football forwards
Association football midfielders
Arcadia Shepherds F.C. players
American Indoor Soccer Association players
American Soccer League (1988–89) players
Feyenoord players
Eredivisie players
Expatriate footballers in the Netherlands
Expatriate soccer players in the United States
Expatriate soccer players in Canada
North American Soccer League (1968–1984) players
Oakland Stompers players
South African soccer players
South African expatriate soccer players
South African expatriate sportspeople in the Netherlands
South African expatriate sportspeople in the United States
South African expatriate sportspeople in Canada
Tampa Bay Rowdies (1975–1993) players
Toronto Blizzard (1971–1984) players
White South African people
South African people of Scottish descent
South African people of German descent
National Football League (South Africa) players